Jessica Jane Shaw (born 3 September 1978) is an Australian politician. She has been a Labor member of the Western Australian Legislative Assembly since the 2017 state election, representing Swan Hills.

Shaw studied law at Cambridge University and worked as a consultant for an engineering firm before entering politics.

References

1978 births
Living people
Australian Labor Party members of the Parliament of Western Australia
Members of the Western Australian Legislative Assembly
English emigrants to Australia
Women members of the Western Australian Legislative Assembly
21st-century Australian politicians
21st-century Australian women politicians